This is a list of all present sovereign states in North America and their predecessors. The division between North and South America is unclear, generally viewed as lying somewhere in the Isthmus of Panama, however, the Caribbean Islands, Central America including the whole of Panama is considered to be part of North America as its southernmost nation. The continent was colonized by the Europeans: Mainly by the Spaniards, the French, the English and the Dutch. The United States of America gained its independence in American Revolutionary War; most of nations in Central America gained independence in the early 19th century; Canada and many other island countries in the Caribbean Sea (most of them were British colonies) gained their independence in 20th century. Today, North America consists of twenty-two sovereign states with common government system being some form of presidential republic.

See also
List of sovereign states and dependent territories in North America
Succession of states
Decolonization of the Americas
Timeline of sovereign states in North America

Lists of former countries
Sov
Former countries in North America
History of North America